Mami Tani née Sato (谷 真海, Tani Mami, born 12 March 1982) is a Japanese paratriathlete and former long jumper. She was a World bronze medalist and has competed in three Paralympic Games in track and field, her highest achievement was reaching sixth place at the 2008 Summer Paralympics. Tani competed at the 2020 Summer Paralympics as a triathlete and finished in tenth position.

Tani had her right leg amputated below her knee after she developed osteosarcoma while at Waseda University.

References

1982 births
Living people
Paralympic athletes of Japan
Paratriathletes of Japan
Japanese female long jumpers
Japanese female triathletes
Athletes (track and field) at the 2004 Summer Paralympics
Athletes (track and field) at the 2008 Summer Paralympics
Athletes (track and field) at the 2012 Summer Paralympics
Paratriathletes at the 2020 Summer Paralympics
Medalists at the World Para Athletics Championships
20th-century Japanese women
21st-century Japanese women